The  or  ("Illuminated scrolls from the founders of the Kegon Sect"; also translated as "Illustrated Legends of the Kegon Patriarchs", "Legends of the Kegon Sect" or "Scrolls of the Founding of the Kegon Sect") is an  or  (painted narrative handscroll) from the beginning of the 13th century, in the Kamakura period of Japanese history (1185–1333). An illuminated manuscript, it narrates in six paper scrolls the Buddhist legend of the founding of the Kegon school in Korea, and the lives of its two founding monks Gishō and Gengyō.

Background

An  consists of one or more long rolls of paper narrating a story through  texts and paintings. Originating in Japan in the sixth or seventh century through trade with the Chinese Empire,  art spread widely among the aristocracy in the Heian period.

Later, the advent of the Kamakura period was marked by internal strife and civil wars, which spread and favoured the rise of the warrior class (the ); the latter put into the spotlight a realistic, less mannered and esoteric, aristocratic culture (the Zen school also appeared at that time). In addition, from these social disturbances a fertile ground for Buddhist proselytism was born, as several new schools, mainly from the Pure Land tradition, appeared in Japan. The old schools in vogue during the Nara period, including the Kegon school, also experienced a resurgence of interest.

The term "engi" (as in ) designates a Japanese narrative style that transcribes chronicles and legends about the founding of Buddhist temples; as for the term "eden" (part of ), it designates the biographies of famous monks.

Description

Four are dedicated to Gishō and two to Gengyō.

Gishō and Gengyō are two humble monks who plan to go to China to complete their learning of Buddhism. However, and as depicted in the first scroll, Gengyō gives up from the start, convinced in a dream that he must seek salvation in himself, and the two friends separate. The following three scrolls are dedicated to the legend of Gishō and Zenmyō (Shan-miao), a young Chinese girl who falls in love with him while he is on his pilgrimage to China. Gishō converts Zenmyō to Buddhism, then begins his return to his own country, to the great despair of the young girl. Zenmyō, rushing to the port, arrives too late to offer him a farewell gift, and his boat disappears over the horizon; in despair, she throws the offering into the water which then follows the boat carrying her beloved. Struck by this miracle, she throws herself into the water, swearing to protect her beloved forever, and transforms into a dragon to carry Gishō's boat on her back for the rest of the journey to Korea. There the boat turns into a mountain on which a temple is erected and Zenmyō has since been revered as the patron goddess of the Kegon sect. This dramatic story is famous in Japan and several collections of legends relate it.

The other scrolls are dedicated to Gengyō and therefore take place in Korea (the kingdom of Silla), although the separation of Gishō and Gengyō from each other is also related at the beginning. The artist tells in particular how Gengyō obtains the Vajrasamddhi sutra from the king of the seas in order to save the seriously ill queen.

Several specialists have stressed the importance of the didactic aspect of the scroll: the teaching of the legend of the founding of the temple should remain central in the analysis of the content. Indeed, the separate accounts of the lives of the two monks illustrate in a simple way the ways of enlightenment advocated by the Kegon school: in the case of Gengyō, the dream that initiates the search for the purity of the spirit by removing it from earthly constraints, and in the case of Gishō the pilgrimage for learning the dharma. These simple answers reflect the new thoughts of society in the Kamakura period.

Dating, author and sponsor

Although the date of creation and the author remain subject to interpretation, it seems clear that the scrolls approach a pictorial style characteristic of Kamakura art, marked by a certain realism and a proximity to humanity.

Comparative and historical studies have enabled KL Brock to put forward two possible dates of creation of the work: between 1218 and 1223 for the Gishō scrolls, and in the 1220s or 1230 for the Gengyō scrolls.

Style and composition

The  is an example of the  style, and demonstrates the evolution of painting in the Kamakura period. Indeed, the Kamakura  valued more realistic and dynamic narratives (historical and religious). However, scholars assume that the work shows the first influences of Chinese Song painting in Japan (characterized by the wash technique), through the fine India ink lines and the pale colour which reveals the movements of the brush.  This style of painting gives the whole  a light and airy tone; it seems clear that , a scholar of Chinese spirituality, had brought in a large number of contemporary works from the mainland which probably inspired the studio of monk-painters associated with the temple.

The treatment of the water, depicted as fine wavelets in ink enhanced with light blue, the fiercer colours of the dragon and the frail human beings give the whole a "remarkable sense of drama".

In the third scroll, a succession of scenes alternately showing Zenmyō and the ship moving away creates a cinematic narrative rhythm. As for the texts, they are very brief and indicate the words or actions of the characters; their purpose could have been to be read aloud during sessions of explanation of the scrolls to the faithful. Still unusual at the time, the characters' lyrics were sometimes calligraphed just above them, very loosely and in Japanese characters. Art historians have traditionally attributed the texts to  himself, although disputes have since arisen, notably in relation to the Gengyō portion.

Historiographical value

As an everyday narrative art,  usually provide a great deal of information on the life and history of medieval Japan. However, this work differs from others in that it is set in Korea and China, and instead depicts the clothing and architecture of the Tang dynasty. Through its treatment of its religious message and its style, it also offers a special insight into the society and culture of the Kamakura period.

Some historians also the link the work with the Jōkyū War (1221), during which  protected ladies of the court; the legend of Zenmyō could have been a springboard to convert them to Kegon Buddhism by providing them with a model of a virtuous woman. In 1223,  erected , a temple in her honour near Kyoto.

Provenance
However, the work has survived in a fragmentary way and some sections are missing; the reconstruction of the original scrolls has given rise to numerous studies, the most important of which is that of KL Brock in 1984.

See also
List of National Treasures of Japan (paintings)
National Treasure (Japan)

References

Notes

Bibliography

External links

Emakimono
National Treasures of Japan